TV 2 Science Fiction was a Norwegian television channel showing science fiction programs, TV-series and movies. The channel was run in cooperation with the Swedish channel TV4 Science fiction and from April 2009 was available only as a Web-TV channel (on TV 2 Sumo). The channel where planned to be available via TV 2's IPTV distributors, but in January 2012, the channel was closed.

References

TV 2 (Norway)
Television channels and stations established in 2009
Television channels and stations disestablished in 2011
2009 establishments in Norway
2011 disestablishments in Norway
Defunct television channels in Norway